Sympycnodes epicycla is a species of moth in the family Cossidae. It is found in Australia, where it is widely distributed in the eastern part of the continent. The habitat consists of dry to wet sclerophyll forests and woodland.

The wingspan is 29–42 mm for males and 41 mm for females. The forewings are pale fuscous, with a dark brown spot and various strigulae (fine streaks). Adults have been recorded on wing from November to March.

References

Moths described in 1945
Zeuzerinae